Russell Millpond, also known as Russell Mill Pond, is a  pond in the Chiltonville village of Plymouth, Massachusetts, United States. Fed by springs and water from cranberry bogs, the outflow of the pond is the Eel River. The water quality is impaired due to non-native aquatic plants in the pond.

External links
Environmental Protection Agency
South Shore Coastal Watersheds - Lake Assessments

Ponds of Plymouth, Massachusetts
Ponds of Massachusetts